Edward Lascelles Fleming (c. 1891 – 17 February 1950) was a Conservative Party politician in the United Kingdom.

He unsuccessfully contested the Leigh constituency at the 1922 general election, and did not stand again until the 1931 general election, when he won the Manchester Withington seat.  He remained Withington's Member of Parliament (MP) until the 1950 general election when he stood as a candidate in the Manchester Moss Side seat but died six days before polling day.

References

External links 
 

1890s births
1950 deaths
Conservative Party (UK) MPs for English constituencies
UK MPs 1931–1935
UK MPs 1935–1945
UK MPs 1945–1950